Leo Nolan (9 February 1910 – 11 February 1993) was a former Australian rules footballer who played with Melbourne in the Victorian Football League (VFL), who was originally from the Wangaratta Football Club, but played with Maryborough in 1931.

Educated at the Wangaratta High School, he early developed an liking for football. He originally played with Wangaratta then played in a Railway competition on the Heidelberg line for one season, and showed promise. Then he shifted to the Chiltern & District Football Association and had one season with Wodonga. His railway employment necessitated his being at Mildura for two seasons, and he played there.

He then had one Ballarat Football League premiership season at Maryborough in 1931 and was then transferred to Melbourne in 1932. 

Cleared to Wangaratta in early 1933, he kicked 85 goals in an Ovens and Murray Football League premiership season.

In 1934 he joined Leeton Football Club  and set up a Nolan Brothers Sports Store in Leeton. He was an outstanding local cricketer, golfer and tennis player, winning many titles during his time at Leeton.

Nolan's brother's Clarrie and Jack both played VFL with North Melbourne.

Notes

External links

1933 Wangaratta Football Club team photo

1910 births
Australian rules footballers from Victoria (Australia)
Melbourne Football Club players
1993 deaths